Hong Kong participated in the 2010 Summer Youth Olympics in Singapore.

The Hong Kong delegation consisted of 14 athletes competing in 7 sports: aquatics (swimming), athletics, equestrian, fencing, sailing, table tennis and triathlon.

Medalists

Athletics

Girls
Field Events

Equestrian

Fencing

Group Stage

Knock-Out Stage

Sailing

Windsurfing

Swimming

Table tennis

Individual

Team

Triathlon

Girls

Men's

Mixed

References

External links
Competitors List: Hong Kong  

2010 in Hong Kong sport
Nations at the 2010 Summer Youth Olympics
Hong Kong at the Youth Olympics